Bruno Goldammer (12 November 1904 – 1968 or 1969) was a German footballer. He played club football with Helvetia Frankfurt (today Rot-Weiss Frankfurt) and Eintracht Frankfurt. 

Goldhammer played for Helvetia Frankfurt. When the Bockenheim based clubs Helvetia and VfR 01 merged to form SC Rot-Weiss Frankfurt Goldammer left to join Eintracht.

In his second season Goldammer captained the Riederwald side and led the Eagles to step out from under the shadow of local rivals FSV Frankfurt, winning four Bezirksliga Main-Hessen titles in a row from 1928 to 1932. When Eintracht won their first South German championship Goldammer played all 30 competitive matches.

His role was described as a tireless destroyer who made valuable contributions in build up play. Apart from good heading, he regularly fired forceful long shots at goal.

In 1928 he was called up twice for the South German regional selection.

In the 1931–32 campaign he lost his spot to Bernhard Leis and only appeared once more when he replaced German international Hans Stubb as a left defender in a 1-0 victory to Hanau 93.

Honours

National
 German Championship
 Runners-up: 1932

 Southern German Championship
 Champion: 1929–30, 1931–32
 Runner-up: 1927–28, 1930–31

 Bezirksliga Main-Hessen:
 Winner: 1927–28, 1928–29, 1929–30, 1930–31, 1931–32
 Runner-up: 1932–33

Sources

External links
 Bruno Goldammer at eintracht-archiv.de

1904 births
1960s deaths
Year of death uncertain
German footballers
Rot-Weiss Frankfurt players
Eintracht Frankfurt players
Association football midfielders